Immediate early response 2 is a protein that in humans is encoded by the IER2 gene.

References

Further reading